Stockton-on-Tees Borough Council elections are held every four years. Stockton-on-Tees Borough Council is the local authority for the unitary authority of Stockton-on-Tees, which straddles the ceremonial counties of County Durham and North Yorkshire, England. Until 1 April 1996 it was a non-metropolitan district in Cleveland.

Political control
An earlier municipal borough of Stockton-on-Tees had existed from 1836 until 1968. That council was abolished and replaced by the short-lived County Borough of Teesside from 1968 to 1974. Under the Local Government Act 1972 a new non-metropolitan district called Stockton-on-Tees was established, with a larger territory than the pre-1968 borough. The first election to the council was held in 1973, initially operating as a shadow authority before coming into its powers on 1 April 1974. County-level services were provided by Cleveland County Council until its abolition in 1996, when Stockton-on-Tees became a unitary authority. Political control of the council since 1973 has been held by the following parties:

Non-metropolitan district

Unitary authority

Leadership
The leaders of the council since 1990 have been:

Council elections

Non-metropolitan district elections
1973 Stockton-on-Tees Borough Council election
1976 Stockton-on-Tees Borough Council election
1979 Stockton-on-Tees Borough Council election (New ward boundaries)
1983 Stockton-on-Tees Borough Council election (Borough boundary changes took place but the number of seats remained the same)
1987 Stockton-on-Tees Borough Council election
1991 Stockton-on-Tees Borough Council election (Borough boundary changes took place but the number of seats remained the same)

Unitary authority elections
1995 Stockton-on-Tees Borough Council election
1999 Stockton-on-Tees Borough Council election
2003 Stockton-on-Tees Borough Council election
2005 Stockton-on-Tees Borough Council election (New ward boundaries increased the number of seats by 1)
2007 Stockton-on-Tees Borough Council election
2011 Stockton-on-Tees Borough Council election
2015 Stockton-on-Tees Borough Council election
2019 Stockton-on-Tees Borough Council election
2023 Stockton-on-Tees Borough Council election

By-election results

1995–1999

1999–2003

2005–2007

2007–2011

2011-2015

2015-2019

2019-2023

Andrew Stephenson was the incumbent councillor, having been disqualified due to non-attendance.

References

External links
Stockton-on-Tees Borough Council
By-election results

 
Council elections in County Durham
Council elections in North Yorkshire
Unitary authority elections in England
Council elections in Cleveland